The Karnataka State Road Transport Corporation - (Karnataka SRTC or KSRTC) is a state-owned public road transport corporation in the Indian state of Karnataka. It is wholly owned by the Government of Karnataka. It serves routes to towns and cities in the Southern part of Karnataka and connects it to the rest of the state and the states of Tamil Nadu, Kerala, Telangana, Andhra Pradesh, Maharashtra, Goa and the Union territory of Puducherry.

History

Foundation
Mysore Government Road Transport Department was inaugurated on 12 September 1948 with 120 buses. The transport department of The Mysore state administrated it until 1961.

Corporatization
It was subsequently converted into an independent corporation under Section 3 of the Road Transport Corporation Act, 1950 on 1 August 1961, In 1961, after successfully converting into an independent corporation all assets and liabilities of MGRTD were transferred to Mysore State Road Transport Corporation.

Merger 
On 1 October 1961, Bangalore Transport Service was merged with it.

Renaming
On 1 November 1973, the Mysore state was renamed as Karnataka thus, renaming it Karnataka State Road Transport Corporation.

Bifurcation
 On 15 August 1997, Bengaluru Metropolitan Transport Corporation (then Bangalore Metropolitan Transport Corporation) was bifurcated to cater to the transportation needs of Bengaluru Metropolitan Region. It was formed by separating the Bangalore Transport Service.
 on 1 November 1997, North Western Karnataka Road Transport Corporation was bifurcated to cater to the transportation needs of Northwestern parts of Karnataka.
 On 15 August 2000, Kalyana Karnataka Road Transport Corporation (then North Eastern Karnataka Road Transport Corporation) was bifurcated to cater to the transportation needs of Northeastern parts of Karnataka.
This left the corporation to serve the Southern part of Karnataka.

 On 23 November 2009, Vijayapura division was transferred from NWKRTC to KKRTC.

Services
Karnataka Sarige: It is a non-AC bus service with 3+2 non-reclining seats built on single-axle Ashok Leyland, Tata and Eicher suburban chassis with a durangi livery of two colours consisting of silver and red colours. It is an interdistrict, interstate service in Dakshina Karnataka (Southern Karnataka).
Gramantara Sarige: It is a non-AC bus service with 3+2 non-reclining seats built on single-axle Ashok Leyland, Tata and Eicher suburban chassis with a durangi livery of two colours consisting of blue and white colours. It is a service to connect villages to nearby cities and towns in Dakshina Karnataka (Southern Karnataka).
Nagara Sarige: It is a non-AC bus service with 2+2 non-reclining seats built on single-axle Ashok Leyland, Tata and Eicher urban chassis with various liveries depending upon the locale. It is an intracity and town service in Dakshina Karnataka (Southern Karnataka) except for Bengaluru. Bengaluru Metropolitan Region is served by Bengaluru Metropolitan Transport Corporation.
AC Nagara Sarige: It is a AC bus service with 2+2 non-reclining seats built on multi-axle Volvo urban chassis with various liveries depending upon the locale. It is an intracity and town service in Dakshina Karnataka (Southern Karnataka) except for Bengaluru. Bengaluru Metropolitan Region is served by Bengaluru Metropolitan Transport Corporation.
Samparka Sarige: It is a non-AC bus service with 2+2 non-reclining seats built on single-axle Ashok Leyland, Tata and Eicher with white-pink livery. It is a shuttle bus service between Kempegowda Bus Station and Mysuru Road Bus Station in Bengaluru.
Rajahamsa Executive Class: It is a non-AC ultra-deluxe bus service with 2+2 reclining seats built on single-axle Ashok Leyland, Tata and Eicher chassis with a white livery. It is a long-distance service operating out of Dakshina Karnataka (Southern Karnataka).
Non-AC Sleeper Class: It is a non-AC ultra-deluxe bus service with 2+1 lower and upper berth sleeper seats built on single-axle Ashok Leyland, Tata and Eicher chassis with a white livery. It is a long-distance service operating out of Dakshina Karnataka (Southern Karnataka).
Airavat Class: It is an AC luxury bus service with 2+2 reclining semi-sleeper seats built on a single-axle Volvo B7R chassis with a white livery. It is a long-distance service operating out of Dakshina Karnataka (Southern Karnataka).
Airavat Club Class: It is an AC luxury bus service with 2+2 reclining seats built on a multi-axle Volvo B9R (Old) or Volvo B11R (New), Scania Metrolink and Mercedes-Benz 0 500 R 1830 chassis with a white livery. It is a long-distance service operating out of Dakshina Karnataka (Southern Karnataka).
Ambaari Class: It is an AC luxury bus service with 2+1 lower and upper berth sleeper seats built on a single-axle Corona chassis with a white livery. It is a long-distance service operating out of Dakshina Karnataka (Southern Karnataka).
Ambaari Dream Class: It is an AC luxury bus service with 2+1 lower and upper berth sleeper seats built on a multi-axle Volvo B11R chassis with a white livery. It is a long-distance service operating out of Dakshina Karnataka (Southern Karnataka).
Ambaari Utsav Class: It is an AC luxury bus service with 2+1 lower and upper berth sleeper seats on a 9600 Volvo Multi-axle sleeper with a light-blue livery. It is a long-distance service operating out of Dakshina Karnataka (Southern Karnataka).
Flybus: It is an AC luxury bus service with 2+2 reclining seats with chemical toilets, Wi-Fi, and an auto hand wash system built on a multi-axle Volvo B9R (Old) or Volvo B11R (New) chassis with a golden livery. It is a service connecting Kempegowda International Airport, Bengaluru to Mysuru, Madikeri and Kundapura.
EV- Power Plus+: It is an electric AC luxury bus service with 2+2 reclining seats built by Olectra with a blue livery. It is presently running on a trial basis between the cities of Bengaluru and Mysuru. It is expected to be operated on various intrastate and interstate routes out of Dakshina Karnataka (Southern Karnataka).

Former Services
Meghdooth Class: It is an AC luxury bus service with 2+2 reclining seats built on a single-axle Ashok Leyland chassis with a dark blue-white livery. It is a long-distance service operating out of Dakshina Karnataka (Southern Karnataka). This service was replaced with Sheethal Class.
Sheethal Class: It is an AC luxury bus service with 2+2 reclining seats built on a single-axle Ashok Leyland chassis with a green livery. It is a long-distance service operating out of Dakshina Karnataka (Southern Karnataka). This service was replaced with Airavat Class.
Vaibhav Class: It is an AC luxury bus service with 2+2 reclining seats with less reclining compared to Rajahamsa Executive Class built on a single-axle Ashok Leyland chassis with a white livery. It is a long-distance service operating out of Dakshina Karnataka (Southern Karnataka). Currently defunct.
Airavat Bliss Class: It is an AC luxury bus service with 2+2 reclining seats with chemical toilets, Wi-Fi, pantry and individual TV screens built on a multi-axle Volvo chassis with a white livery. It is a long-distance service operating out of Dakshina Karnataka (Southern Karnataka). Currently defunct.
Airavat Superia Class:  It is an AC luxury bus service with 2+2 reclining seats with chemical toilets, Wi-Fi, and an auto hand wash system built on a multi-axle Volvo chassis with a white livery. It is a long-distance service operating out of Dakshina Karnataka (Southern Karnataka). Currently defunct.
Airavat Diamond Class: It is an AC luxury bus service with 2+2 reclining seats built on a multi-axle Scania chassis with a white livery. It is a long-distance service operating out of Dakshina Karnataka (Southern Karnataka). Rebranded and merged with Airavat Club Class.

All Karnataka's Road Transport Corporations
Karnataka State Road Transport Corporation: Operates out of Southern Karnataka.
North Western Karnataka Road Transport Corporation: Operates out of Northwestern Karnataka except Vijayapura district.
Kalyana Karnataka Road Transport Corporation: Operates out of Northeastern Karnataka and Vijayapura district.
Bengaluru Metropolitan Transport Corporation: Operates in Bengaluru Metropolitan Region offering transit service.

Namma Cargo Logistics and Parcel Services 
Namma Cargo Logistics and Parcel Services was launched on 26 February 2021. It provides cargo and parcel services on the routes in which The KSRTC (Karnataka), NWKRTC and KKRTC buses travel.

Gallery

See also

List of bus depots in Karnataka
List of bus stations in Karnataka
North Western Karnataka Road Transport Corporation
Kalyana Karnataka Road Transport Corporation
Bengaluru Metropolitan Transport Corporation

References

Transport in Karnataka
Bus companies of India
Economy of Karnataka
State agencies of Karnataka
State road transport corporations of India
Companies based in Bangalore
1961 establishments in Mysore State
Transport companies established in 1961
Bus transport in Karnataka